Vicky Brago-Mitchell is an American fractal artist known in the 1960s as a Stanford University student who, while working as a topless dancer, ran for student body president.  She won the preliminary election, but lost to eventual Earth Day national coordinator Denis Hayes in a two-person runoff election.  She was born on September 30, 1946 in Yakima, Washington.  Daughter of a Methodist minister, she grew up as Victoria Jane Bowles in small towns in Washington, Oregon and Montana. After graduating from high school she attended Stanford University as a scholarship student majoring in Spanish. In 1967 she was the first American college girl to appear nude in a campus magazine, the Stanford Chaparral  (Stanford Chaparral, Spring 1967). In 1968 she began working at night as a topless dancer under the stage name Vicky Drake, and ran for student body president with a campaign poster that was a photo of herself posing nude on the Stanford Mausoleum (Stanford Alumni Magazine, September/October 1994). This story was first reported by the San Francisco Chronicle, May 1, 1968, then carried by wire services Associated Press and United Press International and published in newspapers worldwide. A feature about her titled Student Body appeared in the September 1968 edition of Playboy and was reprinted in the 1971 Playboy special edition The Youth Culture.

From 1970 to 1974 she toured the United States and Japan as a stripper, then stayed in Japan for two years, working as a translator, photographer and English teacher. In 1977 she obtained a teaching credential from California State University, Fullerton, then worked as an elementary school teacher until 2005.

In 2002, she produced a CD of her husband composer John Mitchell’s chamber music for string instruments, recorded in Moscow, and in 2006 arranged the production of a double CD of his chamber music for woodwind instruments by MMC Recordings in Boston, featuring clarinetist Richard Stoltzman. In 2005 her fractal art appeared on the cover of Latin Finance magazine and was shown at the  Biennale Internazionale dell’Arte Contemporanea in Florence, Italy.

References
art.com
ArtisSpectrum April 2005
Agora Gallery December 15, 2005-January 10, 2006
TIME Magazine May 17, 1968
California Alumni Association at UC Berkeley September 2001
Bookrags America 1960-1969: Lifestyles and Social Trends
Federal Elections Commission, June 14, 2006
Biennale Internazionale dell’Arte Contemporanea 2005, 18:18, December 11, 2005

External links
Website

1946 births
Living people
American artists
Mathematical artists
People from Yakima, Washington